The 1978 New South Wales referendum was held on 17 June 1978 and contained a single question:Do you approve of the Bill entitled 'A Bill for an Act to provide for the election of members of the Legislative Council directly by the people'.

Background
The Lang Labor government unsuccessfully attempted to abolish the Legislative Council in 1925 and 1930. In 1961 a referendum to abolish the council was put to New South Wales voters however it was defeated with only 42% support.

Amendments to the constitution
The headline change by the proposal was to alter the Constitution Act 1902 to provide for the members of the Legislative Council to be directly elected. The proposal included other changes, being:
 a reduction in the number of members from 60 to 43, increasing to 44 and then 45;
 Elections for the council to be held simultaneously with elections for the Legislative Assembly;
 The term of members being reduced from a fixed 12 years to a maximum of 9 years; and
 A third of members being elected at each election, rather than the previous quarter.

The transitional arrangements were that the members whose terms were due to expire in 1979 or 1982 had their terms expire at the next general election, held in 1978, those members whose terms were to expire in 1985 would retire at the second general election, held in 1981, and those members whose terms were to expire in 1988 would retire at the third general election, held in 1984.

Results
The question was approved with a large majority.

Legislative Council referendums
This was the third referendum in New South Wales on the subject of the Legislative Council.

See also 
 Referendums in New South Wales
 Referendums in Australia

References

Referendums in New South Wales
New South Wales law
1980s in New South Wales
September 1981 events in Australia